Phillip Prodger (born 16 October 1967) is a museum professional, curator, author, and art historian. He is the Senior Research Scholar at the Yale Center for British Art and formerly served as Head of Photographs at the National Portrait Gallery, London. Born in Margate, Kent, he currently resides outside of New Haven, Connecticut.

Education 
Phillip Prodger received his bachelor's degree at Williams College in 1989 and his master's degree at Stanford University in 1995. In 2000, Prodger received his Ph.D. in history of art from University of Cambridge. He attended secondary school in Hong Kong at Hong Kong International School from 1982-1985.

Career 
After a brief tenure as a lecturer at the Hong Kong Arts Centre, Prodger began his museum career at the Iris and B. Gerald Cantor Center for the Visual Arts at Stanford University in 1990. In 2001, he became the Assistant Curator of Prints, Drawings and Photographs at the Saint Louis Art Museum.  He became the founding Curator of Photography at the Peabody Essex Museum in 2008 and was named Head of Photographs at the National Portrait Gallery, London in 2014.

In 2017, Prodger was given the Rome Award from the Paul Mellon Centre and the British School at Rome. In 2013, he received a Focus Award for contributions to the appreciation and understanding of photography. In 2007, he was named the Lisette Model and Joseph G. Blum Fellow at the National Gallery of Canada.

Research 
Prodger's primary area of expertise is in European and American art from the nineteenth century to the present. He has published extensively on topics in the history of photography and art/science interactions. Much of his work centers on the rise of photographic vision and its effect on modern logic systems.

Prodger has devoted much research to the so-called ‘second invention’ of photography, when wet-plate collodion supplanted Daguerreian and paper negative technologies in the 1850s-70s. During this time, it became possible to record things occurring too rapidly to be seen with the naked eye. This is the central theme of three of Prodger's books—Time Stands Still (Oxford, 2003), which analyses the work of Eadweard Muybridge in relation to contemporaneous motion photography; Darwin’s Camera (Oxford, 2009), which examines Charles Darwin’s interest in recording facial expressions as they occur; and Victorian Giants (National Portrait Gallery, 2018), which connects the drive for instantaneity in pictures with the rise of art photography in Britain. Prodger coined the term ‘instantaneous photography movement’ to describe the mania for taking photographs of rapidly occurring action in the mid- to late nineteenth century.

Prodger has also written extensively about Modern photography. He is the author of a series, so far including three books (one with Terence Pepper), on Edwardian photographer Emil Otto Hoppé, produced in collaboration with Graham Howe and the E.O. Hoppé Estate in Pasadena, California. He is also an author or co-author of books on Ansel Adams, Ernst Haas, and the partnership between Man Ray and Lee Miller.

In contemporary art, Prodger has written monographs on William Eggleston, Martin Parr, and Jerry Uelsmann. He has also written short texts for monographs by Anderson & Low, Katharine Cooper, Harold Feinstein, Sharon Harper, Anna Kuperberg, Yann Mingard, Suzanne Opton, Paul Outerbridge, Anne Rearick, and Joni Sternbach.

In 2018, he was curator and primary author of an exhibition and catalogue on early Chinese photography produced in association with Tsinghua University and the Loewentheil Collection

Publications

Books and catalogues 
Martin Parr: Only Human, London: Phaidon, 2019. 

E. O. Hoppé: The English, (forthcoming), Gottingen: Steidl, 2019. 
	
The Real Me: Understanding Photo Portraiture in the 21st Century, (forthcoming), London and New York: Thames & Hudson, 2019.

Vision and Reflection: Photographs of 19th Century China from the Loewentheil Collection, Beijing: Tsinghua University Press, 2018.

100 Photographs (editor and introduction), London: National Portrait Gallery, 2018. 
 
Victorian Giants: the Birth of Art Photography. Julia Margaret Cameron, Lewis Carroll, Clementina Hawarden, and Oscar Rejlander, London: National Portrait Gallery, 2018. 

William Eggleston Portraits, London: National Portrait Gallery and New Haven: Yale University Press, 2016. 

E.O. Hoppé, The German Work 1925–1938, Gottingen: Steidl, 2015. 

Ansel Adams: At the Water’s Edge, Salem: Peabody Essex Museum, 2012. 

Man Ray | Lee Miller: Partners in Surrealism, New York and London: Merrell Publishers, 2011. 

Ernst Haas: Color Correction, Gottingen: Steidl, 2011. 

Hoppé Portraits: Society, Studio, and Street, London: National Portrait Gallery, 2011. 

The Mind’s Eye: Fifty Years of Photography by Jerry Uelsmann, San Francisco: ModernBook, 2010. 

Paul Outerbridge: New Color Photographs from California and Mexico, 1948-55, Portland, Oregon: Nazraeli, 2009. 

Darwin’s Camera: Art and Photography in the Theory of Evolution, New York and London: Oxford University Press, 2009. 

Hoppé’s Amerika: Modernist Photographs from the 1920s, New York and London: W. W. Norton & Co., April 2007. 

Impressionist Camera: Pictorial Photography in Europe, 1888-1918, London and New York: Merrell, 2006. 

Time Stands Still: Muybridge and the Instantaneous Photography Movement, Oxford and New York: Oxford University Press, 2003. 

Illustrations of Human and Animal Expression from the Collection of Charles Darwin, Lewiston, New York and Lampeter, Wales: Edwin Mellen Press, 1998.

External links
 Official Site

Interview, “Fleeting Truths: Thoughts on Portrait Photography,” link

Interview, “What Makes a Great Portrait Photograph?” link

Interview, “Much More than a Muse,” NPR link

References 

1967 births
Living people
British curators
British art historians
People from Margate
Williams College alumni
Stanford University alumni
Alumni of the University of Cambridge
British expatriates in Hong Kong
British expatriate academics in the United States